Heather Douglas may refer to:

 Heather Douglas (actress), American musical theatre actress
 Heather Douglas (philosopher) (born 1969), philosopher of science
Heather Douglas, fictional character. Also known as Moondragon.